Elinor Meissner Traeger (July 10, 1906 – December 26, 1983)  was an American composer, pianist, and writer.

Traeger was born in Chicago. After studying music with Len Cleary, Edna Hansen, Antoinnette Lauer, and Bess Ressiguie, she married Fred W. Traeger and they had two children, David and Lois.

Traeger composed, reviewed books and music, and taught piano, mostly in Illinois. Her music was published by Pro Art Publications and Willis Music Company, and included the following pieces for piano:

Carousel

Cradle Song

Sleepytime

References 

American women composers
Compositions for piano
1906 births
1983 deaths
People from Illinois
People from Chicago